Joakim With Steen (born 26 June 1989), better known as Jowst (usually stylised JOWST), is a Norwegian music producer and songwriter. He represented Norway in the Eurovision Song Contest 2017 with the song "Grab the Moment", along with vocalist Aleksander Walmann finishing in 10th place.

Early life and career 
Steen was born in Trondheim and raised in Tiller. At age 14, his family moved to Steinkjer. At the age of fifteen his main focus was guitar, punk, songwriting and band. After finishing his sound and music production education at the renowned Noroff Institute in Oslo, where he later also worked as a teacher and held lectures in the same field. At the same time he also worked as sound technician and producer for Earport Studios in Fornebu. Joakim started Red Line Studio where he has worked as a sound engineer and producer since 2011. With the project "Making a Hit" and the hit song "Grab the Moment" he is now focusing on his own music under the artist name JOWST, an acronym formed from the first letter of his names.

Steen and Norwegian singer Aleksander Walmann were confirmed to be taking part in Melodi Grand Prix 2017, Norway's national selection for the Eurovision Song Contest 2017, on 7 February 2017. In the final, held on 11 March, JOWST and Walmann received the maximum 12 points from four of the eleven international juries in addition to winning the televote. They subsequently advanced to the gold final, where they won the competition. Norway competed in the second half of the second semi-final at the Eurovision Song Contest, and they managed to advance to the final. In the final, they placed 10th out of 26th.

Steen also co-wrote Walmann's song for Melodi Grand Prix 2018 "Talk To The Hand", which progressed to the Gold Final, but failed to progress to the final two, coming fourth in the televote.

In October 2022, Steen along with Byron Williams Jr. was announced as one of the 21 competitors for Melodi Grand Prix 2023 with the song "Freaky for the Weekend". They were placed into the 1st semi-final, performing last (7th). They failed to qualify for the finals.

Personal life 
Joakim is cohabiting with Rita Rybakova, and together they have a daughter Sofia born in 2017.

Discography

Singles
As lead artist

Promotional singles

Remixes

Production credits

References

External links 

Official Eurovision representation

Living people
1989 births
Norwegian record producers
Musicians from Steinkjer
Musicians from Kolbotn
Eurovision Song Contest entrants for Norway
Eurovision Song Contest entrants of 2017
Melodi Grand Prix winners
Norwegian electronic musicians
Norwegian dance musicians